The Ambassador of the United Kingdom to Lebanon is the United Kingdom's foremost diplomatic representative in the Lebanese Republic, and head of the UK's diplomatic mission in Beirut.

The first two British envoys were appointed during World War II to both Lebanon and Syria. Since 1923 both countries had been under French mandate from the League of Nations. During the war, however, France was partly occupied by Germany and French troops in Lebanon and Syria were loyal to the Vichy French government, so the Allies invaded and occupied Lebanon and Syria in 1941. Both countries became independent after the war.

List of heads of mission

Envoy Extraordinary and Minister Plenipotentiary to the Syrian and Lebanese Republics
1942–1944: Major General Sir Edward Spears
1944–1947: Sir Terence Shone

Envoy Extraordinary and Minister Plenipotentiary at Beirut
1947–1951: Sir William Houstoun-Boswall
1951–1952: Edwin Chapman-Andrews

Ambassador Extraordinary and Plenipotentiary at Beirut
1952–1956: Sir Edwin Chapman-Andrews
1956–1958: Sir George Middleton
1958–1963: Sir Moore Crosthwaite
1963–1967: Sir Derek Riches
1967–1970: Cecil King
1970–1971: Alan Edden
1971–1975: Paul Wright
1975–1978: Peter Wakefield
1978–1981: Benjamin Strachan
1981–1983: Sir David Roberts
1983–1985: Sir David Miers
1985–1988: Sir John Gray
1988–1990: Sir Allan Ramsay
1990–1992: David Tatham
1992–1996: Maeve Fort
1996–2000: David MacLennan
2000–2003: Richard Kinchen
2003–2006: James Watt
2006–2011: Frances Guy
2011–2015: Thomas Fletcher
2015–2018: Hugo Shorter
2018–2020: Chris Rampling

2021–: Ian Collard

References

External links
UK and Lebanon, gov.uk

Lebanon
 
United Kingdom Ambassadors